Grywałd  is a village in the administrative district of Gmina Krościenko nad Dunajcem, within Nowy Targ County, Lesser Poland Voivodeship, in southern Poland, close to the border with Slovakia.

The village has a population of 1,670.

The village was first mentioned in a written document in 1330 as Grunevald and in 1335 as Grunvald.

References

Villages in Nowy Targ County